Samuel Lynn  (25 December 1920 – January 1995) was an English footballer. His regular position was at wing half. He was born in St Helens, Lancashire. He played for Manchester United and Bradford Park Avenue in The Football League, and also played for Wigan Athletic in the Lancashire Combination.

References

External links
MUFCInfo.com profile

1920 births
1995 deaths
Bradford (Park Avenue) A.F.C. players
English footballers
Manchester United F.C. players
English Football League players
Association football wing halves
Wigan Athletic F.C. players